The canton of Salon-de-Provence-2 is an administrative division of the Bouches-du-Rhône department, in southeastern France. It was created at the French canton reorganisation which came into effect in March 2015. Its seat is in Salon-de-Provence.

It consists of the following communes: 
Grans 
Miramas
Saint-Martin-de-Crau
Salon-de-Provence (partly)

References

Cantons of Bouches-du-Rhône